Department of General Services can refer to agencies of various governments:

United States
 California Department of General Services
 Pennsylvania Department of General Services